Shivtzov was the name of noble family of Orenburg Cossacks origin. Ivan Ilijich Shivtzov was an Ataman of stanitsa Vozdvízhenskaya and a member of an Orenburg Cossack rada in time of ataman Alexander Dutov revolt against the Soviet authorities in Orenburg Host in 1918.

 Sergey Ivanovich Shivtzov

References

Russian noble families
Orenburg Cossacks